The 1884 Hackney by-election was fought on 20 November 1884. It was triggered by the death of Liberal MP Henry Fawcett.

Results

References 

1884 elections in the United Kingdom
Hackney, London
1884 in England
1880s in London